Trine may refer to:

People
 Ralph Waldo Trine, American philosopher and educator
 Trine Dyrholm, Danish actress
 Trine Jensen, Danish handball player
 Trine Tsouderos, American journalist

Religion and mythology
 Trine (astrological aspect), an angle between planets of a horoscope
 The Trinity, in Christian theology

Other uses
 Trine University, a small private university in Angola, Indiana, United States
 Trine (trimaran), a  sloop sailboat built in the early 1960s
 Trine (video game), a 2009 video game by Frozenbyte
The number three

See also

Toine